Arturo Herrera (born 1959) is a Venezuelan visual artist who exhibits internationally, known for his melding of cartoons and collage. He has had one-person exhibitions at Centre d’Art Contemporain, Dia Center For The Arts, Centro Galego de Arte Contemporánea, Whitney Museum of American Art, UCLA Hammer Museum, and P.S. 1 Contemporary Art Center. He moved to Berlin in 2003 for a residency through the German Academic Exchange Service and remained as of 2014.

Utilizing fragments of imagery borrowed from popular culture, Arturo Herrera creates collages, felt sculptures, and wall paintings that lie on the shifting border between legibility and abstraction. He especially favors screen printing, which he compares to drawing for its spontaneity and openness to variation between prints. Frequently reworking discarded material, such as books or comics, Herrera takes pride in giving the artifacts a new and "different" life in which they "can go on."

Selected works 
 All I Ask (1999)
 For the First Time (1999)
 Say Seven (2000)
 A Knock (2002)
 Night Before Last (2003)
 Keep in Touch (2004)
 Berlin Singers (2010)
 Giuseppe, Richard, and Johannes (2012)
 Books (2012)

Selected exhibitions 
 1998: "Arturo Herrera" The Renaissance Society of the University of Chicago, Chicago, IL., Jan. 11 – Feb. 22.
 1999: "Color Me Blind! Malerei in Zeiten von Computergame und Comic", Württembergischer Kunstverein, Stuttgart, Germany. Nov. 13,
1999-Jan. 16, 2000.
 2000: Greater New York, P.S.1 Contemporary Art Center, New York, NY. Feb. 27 - May. 16.
 2001: Painting at the Edge of the World, The Walker Art Center, Minneapolis, MN. Feb. 10 – May. 6.
 2002: Urgent Painting, Musee d’Art Moderne de la Ville de Paris, Paris, France. Jan. 17 – Mar. 3.
 2003: The Moderns, Castello di Rivoli, Museo d’Arte Contemporanea, Rivoli, Italy. Apr. 16 – Aug. 3. 
 2004: Funny Cuts: Cartoons und Comics in der zeitgenössische Kunts, Staatsgalerie Stuttgart, Germany. Dec. 4, 2004–Apr. 17, 2005.
 2005: "Arturo Herrera" Centro Galego de Arte Contemporanea, Santiago de Compostela, Spain. Apr. 7 – June 19.
 2006: Big Juicy Paintings (And More): Highlights from the Permanent Collection, Miami Art Museum, Miami, FL. Jun. 16 – Sep. 17.
 2007: "Comic-Abstraction: Image-Breaking, Image-Making", Museum of Modern Art, New York, NY. Mar. 4 – June 11.
 2008: "La invención de lo cotidiano", Acervos del Museo Nacional de Arte y de La Colección Jumex, Mexico City, Mexico. Nov. 27 – Mar. 11.
 2009: Arturo Herrera - Ruinas Circulares / Circular Ruins, Fundación D.O.P. & Fundación Odalys, Caracas, Venezuela, Jun. 19 - Sep. 30. 
 2010: Arturo Herrera - Home, Haus am Waldsee, Berlin, Germany
 2011: Arturo Herrera: Les Noces (The Wedding), Americas Society, New York; Feb. 3 - Apr. 30.
 2012: "Decade: Contemporary Collecting 2002–2012", Albright-Knox Gallery, Buffalo, NY. Aug. 20, 2012 – Jan. 6, 2013.
 2013: "Parallel Worlds, Independent Creations" – Contemporary Art, Fundación D.O.P, Caracas, Venezuela, Sep. 22. - Dic. 8. 
 2014: Minimal Baroque: Post-Minimalism and Contemporary Art, Rønnebæksholm, Naestved, Denmark, Apr. 6 – Jun. 15.

Important collections

Dia Art Foundation, New York, NY, U.S.A.
Thyssen-Bornemisza Art Contemporary Collection, Vienna, Austria.
Museum of Contemporary Art (MCA), Chicago, IL, U.S.A.
Fundación D.O.P., Madrid, Spain.
Tate Britain, London (England), United Kingdom.
The Metropolitan Museum of Art, New York, NY, U.S.A.
Colección D.O.P., Paris, France.
Louis Vuitton Foundation, Hong Kong, China.
San Francisco Museum of Modern Art, San Francisco, CA, U.S.A.
Whitney Museum of American Art, New York, NY, U.S.A.
Hammer Museum, Los Angeles, CA, U.S.A.
Colección Patricia Phelps de Cisneros (CPPC), Caracas, Venezuela
Art Institute of Chicago, Chicago, IL, U.S.A.
UBS AG Zurich, Zurich, Switzerland
Museum of Fine Arts (MFA), Boston, MA, U.S.A.
ARCO Foundation Collection, Madrid, Spain

Notes and references

Arturo Herrera - Ruinas Circulares / Circular Ruins, page 7,

External links
Herrera at the Museum of Modern Art
Herrera at Art 21
https://arturoherrera.org/
https://art21.org/artist/arturo-herrera/
https://www.tate.org.uk/art/artists/arturo-herrera-6003
https://www.sikkemajenkinsco.com/arturo-herrera

Venezuelan artists
1959 births
Living people